Lingua e Vita is the official magazine of the British Interlingua Society (BIS). Founded in 1965 as an initiative of Brian C. Sexton, Lingua e Vita is a continuation of the earlier organ of the BIS, the Circular Letter.

The publication, which began as a newsletter, had grown over time into a magazine presenting, in addition to news about Interlingua in Britain and other countries, book reviews and discussions of issues in the field of international communication. The new title reflected these developments. The format of the publication also changed from news and notes to news, commentary, and articles on linguistic topics. Like the Circular Letter, the new magazine was written in English and Interlingua.

Interest in Interlingua grew, especially after a conference at the new European Parliament in September, 1993. The BIS began publication of a second magazine, Contacto, to maintain contact with a larger public.

In 1996, F. P. Gopsill became the editor of Lingua e Vita. Gopsill has brought changes to the magazine. Interlingua is now its primary language. It presents articles from a wide variety of sources, together with regular features such as humor, quizzes, and a Christmas edition. Lingua e Vita encourages readers to learn Interlingua and to actively write and speak the language. The editor receives many letters from readers, and these greatly influence the magazine's content.

External links
 Gopsill, F. P., 100 British Editions, Historia de Interlingua, 2001, revised 2006.
 Union Mundial pro Interlingua, the international Interlingua organization.

1965 establishments in the United Kingdom
Book review magazines
Literary magazines published in the United Kingdom
Interlingua
Magazines established in 1965